The 2008–09 Coupe de France was the 92nd season of the French most prestigious cup competition and was open to all clubs in French football, as well as seven teams from overseas departments and territories (Guadeloupe, French Guiana, Martinique, Mayotte, New Caledonia, French Polynesia and Réunion). The final was held on 9 May 2009 at the Stade de France.

Guingamp claimed their first Coupe de France after defeating Rennes 2–1 after two second-half goals from Eduardo.

Calendar
On 8 July 2008, French Football Federation (FFF) announced the calendar for the Coupe de France.

Seventh Round
The draw for the seventh round of Coupe de France was conducted on 5 November 2008 in Lyon by former Lyon players Bernard Lacombe and Jean Djorkaeff, the latter who currently serves as the president of the Coupe de France Commission. The overseas region draw was conducted in Paris the same day, by Olympic medalists Pascal Gentil and Grégory Baugé. The matches were played on 21, 22 and 23 November 2008. The matches that were postponed were played on 30 November.

Overseas Region

Eighth Round
The draw for the eighth round was conducted on 25 November 2008 at the offices of the FFF in Paris. The drawers were current France under-17 coach Philippe Bergeroo and Stéphane Guivarc'h, member of the French squad that won the 1998 FIFA World Cup. The overseas region draw was conducted in Paris as well, by Bernard Diomède, who was also a member of the France squad that won the 1998 FIFA World Cup. The following matches were played on 12, 13 and 14 December 2008. The matches that were postponed were played on 20 December.

Overseas Region

Round of 64
The Round of 64 matches were played on 2, 3 and 4 January 2009. The draw was conducted on 15 December 2008 in Metz by former Nancy greats Olivier Rouyer and Bernard Zénier, former wheelchair fencing champion Yvon Pacault, and Anne Sophie Mathis, who is the current WBC Super-lightweight world champion. The matches that were postponed were played on 10 and 24 January 2009.

Round of 32
The Round of 32 matches were played on 23, 24, 25 and 28 January. The draw was conducted on 4 January in Issy-les-Moulineaux, Paris, at the headquarters of Eurosport by Chloé Mortaud, the recently crowned Miss France and 2008 Summer Olympics bronze medalist Teddy Riner. The Guingamp – Brest match was rescheduled to 20 January.

Round of 16
The Round of 16 matches were played on 3 and 4 March. The draw was conducted on 25 January 2009 in Issy-les-Moulineaux, Paris at the headquarters of Eurosport by French journalist and television host Michel Drucker and former player and manager Michel Hidalgo.

Quarter-finals
The quarterfinal matches were played on 17 and 18 March. The draw was conducted on 8 March 2009 in Versailles, Paris at the Galaxy Foot Salon by French female volleyball player Victoria Rava and French female sprinter Muriel Hurtis.

Semi-finals
The semifinal matches were played on 21 and 22 April. The draw was conducted on 22 March 2009 by current France international Samir Nasri.

Final

Topscorer
Eduardo (7 goals)

Miscellaneous
RC Saint-André were awarded the "Petit Poucet" Plaque for achieving the best performance in the Coupe de France by an amateur club. Saint-André, who play Championnat de District Level 3 managed to reach the 6th round by eliminating Promotion Ligue side Etoile Chapelaine in the 1st Round, three d'Honneur Régionale sides (FC Nogentais, Chaumont PTT, FCO St. Julien) in the 2nd Round, 3rd Round, and 4th Round, respectively. They defeated another Promotion Ligue side in Bagneux Clesles, before suffering elimination to Foyer Barsequanais in the 6th Round. Their exploits allowed the club to accumulate 30 points and thus defeat FCE Schirrhein (29 points), who were eliminated by Ligue 1 club Toulouse after making it all the way to the Round of 32.

Media coverage
In France, France Télévisions were the free to air broadcasters while Eurosport were the subscription broadcasters.

These matches were broadcast live on French television:

External links
 Official site

References

Coupe de France seasons
Coupe De France, 2008-09
Coupe De France